Rowland Glacier is a glacier on the north side of the Frigate Range, flowing east into Lowery Glacier. Mapped by the United States Geological Survey (USGS) from tellurometer surveys and Navy air photos, 1960–62. Named by Advisory Committee on Antarctic Names (US-ACAN) for Robert W. Rowland, United States Antarctic Research Program (USARP) glaciologist at South Pole Station, 1962–1963 and 1963–1964.
 

Glaciers of the Ross Dependency
Shackleton Coast